U-Boat Worx is a Dutch submersible manufacturer. Its headquarters are based in Breda, the Netherlands. The company was founded in 2005 by Dutch entrepreneur Bert Houtman. U-Boat Worx delivers crewed submersibles for exploration, research, yachts and tourism applications.

History 
In the early 2000s, after a successful career in the software industry culminating in the Stock Exchange listing of his company, Exact Software, Houtman commenced looking for a personal submarine for his own enjoyment, only to find that submersibles were the sole domain of military or institutional scientific users.

In his quest to personalise submarines for everyday use, Bert teamed up with a Canadian inventor, Peter Mitton, who had pioneered a small one person Sub (C - Quester) that provided the template for what was to follow.

That partnership ended in 2005; Bert Houtman founded U-Boat Worx determined to expand the audience for private submersibles.

U-Boat Worx delivered in 2015 a private submarine for a Cruise Ship, this was the first cruise ship with a submarine operation onboard. Later the Crystal Esprit and Genting Dream also took delivery of a U-Boat Worx submersibles.

Today the company produces a range of versatile subs for all underwater activities, including the flagship model that can dive to 3,000 meters (9,845 feet).

The Name 
The name "U-Boat Worx" is derived from "underwater boat”, referring to the boat-like handling that was distinctive in the original C-Quester design". A so-called double-hull principle that did not only use diving tanks to achieve positive buoyancy, but also a secondary boat-like hull that could be pumped empty was to make the submersible suitable for longer surface voyage and provide "boat-like" characteristics.

The second part "Worx" is an abbreviation or alteration of "Works", which refers to the industrial nature of the production process.

Models 
U-Boat Worx now has different series of submarines. The following models are in production.

NEMO series
 NEMO-1 – one-person submarine, capable of diving to 100 meters
 NEMO-2 – two-person submarine, capable of diving to 100 meters
Super Yacht Sub series
 Super Yacht Sub 3 –three-person submarine, designed for yachts, capable of diving to 300 meters
C-Researcher series
 C-Researcher 2 – 500 - two-person submarine capable of diving to 500 meters
 C-Researcher 2 – 1140 - two-person submarine capable of diving to 1,140 meters
 C-Researcher 2 – 3000 - two-person submarine capable of diving to 3,000 meters
 C-Researcher 3 – 300 - three-person submarine capable of diving to 300 meters
 C-Researcher 3 – 1140 - three-person submarine capable of diving to 1,140 meters
 C-Researcher 3 – 2500 – three-person submarine capable of diving to 2,500 meters
 C-Researcher 5 – 300 – three-person submarine capable of diving to 300 meters
Cruise Sub series
 Cruise Sub 5 – 500 – five-person submarine, capable of diving to 500 meters
 Cruise Sub 5 – 1140 – five-person submarine, capable of diving to 1,140 meters
 Cruise Sub 5 – 1700 – five-person submarine, capable of diving to 1,700 meters
 Cruise Sub 7 – 300 – seven-person submarine, capable of diving to 300 meters
 Cruise Sub 7 – 1140 – seven-person submarine, capable of diving to 1,140 meters
 Cruise Sub 9 – 300 – nine-person submarine, capable of diving to 300 meters
Super Sub
 Super Sub – 300 – three-person submarine, capable of diving to 300 meters
C-Explorer series
 C-Explorer 3 – three-person submersible, capable of diving to 300 meters
 C-Explorer 5 – five-person submersible, capable of diving to 200 meters

The following U-Boat Worx models are no longer in production.
 C-Quester 1 - one-person submarine
 C-Quester 2 – two-person submarine
 C-Quester 3 – three-person submarine
 C-Explorer 2 – two-person submarine

Applications 
70% of U-Boat Worx clients are private yacht owners who use their private submersible for exploration most of the time. Some of these clients make their private submersibles available for researchers. Other applications U-Boat Worx private submersibles are being used for are tourism and research. Several cruise ships have a U-Boat Worx private submersible available onboard for dive excursions to entertain guests.

Many clients of U-Boat Worx are private owners - as a result the following list is not complete. Known dive operations with U-Boat Worx submersibles are:
 Motor Yacht Legend - a Class 1 ice-breaking charter yacht, which is used on expeditions to remote destinations like Antarctica and Greenland.
 The Russian Geographical Society used two U-Boat Worx submarines during a search and rescue operation - a C-Quester 2 and C-Explorer 3 - at the site of the fall of aircraft Tu-154 in Sochi. This model of sub is usually deployed for research expeditions.
 Cruise Ship Genting Dream of Dream Cruises carries a C-Explorer 5 submarine on each side of the ship.
 Cruise Ship Crystal Esprit, a high-end luxurious cruise ship operated by Crystal Cruises has a C-Explorer 3 onboard to entertain guests.
 Cruise Ship Taipan of star Cruise is the first cruise ship who takes delivery of a private submarine. The C-Explorer 3 can be booked for diving trips during your stay.
 Aurora Trust Foundations partnered with SubSea Explorers and U-Boat Worx to explorer ancient Roman shipwrecks.
 Motor Yacht Sofia, a 42-meter Moonen Yacht carries a C-Quester 3.

Technology 
MANTA Controller – to allow for supervised passenger steering U-Boat Worx developed the MANTA Controller. The pilot can hand over the controller to an untrained guest to let them navigate, under supervision.

MARLIN Controller – To make launch and recovery of the submersible easy and safe, U-Boat Worx developed the MARLIN Controller. This controller allows for wireless control and navigation on the surface without having a person inside the submarine.

U-Boat Worx was the first submarine manufacturer who applied Lithium-ion batteries in her submarines with classification by DNV GL.

Pressure tolerant Battery technology – U-Boat Worx developed a pressure tolerant battery system with an increased capacity of 350% when compared to lead-acid batteries used non U-Boat Worx submersibles. The technology has been tested to 13,000 feet and stores a total of 62 kWh on compact battery modules.

References

Submarines of the Netherlands